Tobi 20 - Coptic Calendar - Tobi 22

The twenty-first day of the Coptic month of Tobi, the fifth month of the Coptic year. On a common year, this day corresponds to January 16, of the Julian Calendar, and January 29, of the Gregorian Calendar. This day falls in the Coptic Season of Shemu, the season of the Harvest.

Commemorations

Feasts 

 The dormition of the Virgin Saint Mary, the Theotokos

Saints 

 The departure of Saint Hilaria, the daughter of Emperor Zeno
 The departure of Saint Gregory of Nyssa, brother of Saint Basil the Great

References 

Days of the Coptic calendar